Galaxy 28 is a communications satellite owned by Intelsat located at 89° West longitude, serving the North America and South America market. It was built by Space Systems/Loral, as part of its SSL 1300 line. Galaxy 28 was formerly known as Telstar 8 and Intelsat Americas 8. This satellite provides services in the C-band, Ku-band, and Ka-band.

History 
Telstar 8 was contracted in 1999 by Loral Skynet to Space Systems/Loral. But on 15 July 2003, Loral filed under Chapter 11 of the United States Bankruptcy Code. In conjunction with the filing, Loral Skynet announced the sale of its North American satellite fleet to INTELSAT to help reduce its debt. Loral announced a definitive agreement to sell Telstar 8 to INTELSAT, renaming the satellite Intelsat Americas 8 (IA 8). INTELSAT changed the name of the Intelsat Americas 8 satellite to Galaxy 28 effective to 1 February 2007.

Satellite description 
Intelsat Americas 8 (also known as IA 8) is an American (Bermuda registered) geostationary satellite that was launched by a Zenit-3SL launch vehicle from Odyssey, the platform floating on the equatorial Pacific Ocean at 154° West longitude, at 14:03:00 UTC on 23 June 2005. The , 16 kW satellite carries 28 C-band, 36 Ku-band, and 24 Ka-band transponders to provide video and data transmissions to all countries in North and South Americas, after parking over 89° West longitude. It was the 28th satellite in the INTELSAT fleet.

Clients 
Current clients for Galaxy 28 include HughesNet, Hearst Corporation, Mobile Universe, ABC, and CBS.

References

External links 
 
 
 
 

Communications satellites in geostationary orbit
Satellite television
Spacecraft launched in 2005